Alessandro d'Este (1568–1624) was a Roman Catholic cardinal.

On  3 Apr 1622, he was consecrated bishop by Marco Antonio Gozzadini, Bishop of Recanati with Raffaele Inviziati, Bishop Emeritus of Cefalonia e Zante, and Giulio Sansedoni, Bishop Emeritus of Grosseto, serving as co-consecrators.

References

1568 births
1624 deaths
17th-century Italian cardinals
People from Ferrara